San Pedro Bay may refer to:

 San Pedro Bay (Philippines), a small bay on Leyte
 San Pedro Bay (California), an inlet on the Pacific coast of the United States
 San Pedro Bay (Florida), a swamp and wildlife management area in north central Florida
 San Pedro Bay (Chile), an open bay in Los Lagos Region